The 1950 Ole Miss Rebels football team was an American football team that represented the University of Mississippi as a member of the Southeastern Conference (SEC) during the 1950 college football season. In their fourth year under head coach Johnny Vaught, the team compiled an overall record of 5–5, with a mark of 1–5 in conference play, placing 11th in the SEC.

Schedule

DE Ray Thornton
OT Rex Reed Bogan
HB John Dottley
HB Wilson Dillard

References

Ole Miss
Ole Miss Rebels football seasons
Ole Miss Rebels football